The Trundholm sun chariot, is a Nordic Bronze Age artifact discovered in Denmark. It is a representation of the  sun chariot,  a bronze statue of a horse and a large bronze disk, which are placed on a device with spoked wheels.

The sculpture was discovered with no accompanying objects in 1902 in a peat bog on the Trundholm moor in Odsherred in the northwestern part of Zealand, (approximately ). It is now in the collection of the National Museum of Denmark in Copenhagen. It is prominently featured on the 1000-krone banknote of the 2009 series.

Description

The horse stands on a bronze rod supported by four wheels. The rod below the horse is connected to the disk, which is supported by two wheels. All of the wheels have four spokes. The artifact was cast in the lost wax method.

It is gilded on one side only, the right-hand side (when looking at the horse from behind). It consists of two bronze disks that are joined by an outer bronze ring, with a thin sheet of gold applied to one face. The disks were then decorated with punches and gravers with zones of motifs of concentric circles, with bands of zig-zag decoration between borders. The gold side has an extra outer zone which may represent rays, and also a zone with concentric circles linked by looping bands that "instead of flowing in one direction, progress like the steps of the dance, twice forward and once back". The main features of the horse are also highly decorated.

The two sides of the disk have been interpreted as an indication of a belief that the Sun is drawn across the heavens from East to West during the day, presenting its bright side to the Earth and returns from West to East during the night, when the dark side is being presented to the Earth. A continuation around a globe would have the same result.  It is thought that the chariot was pulled around during religious rituals to demonstrate the motion of the Sun in the heavens.

Date
The sculpture is dated by the National Museum to about 1400 BC, though other dates have been suggested. It was found before the development of pollen-dating, which would have enabled a more confident dating.

A model of a horse-drawn vehicle on spoked wheels in Northern Europe at such an early time is surprising; they would not be expected to appear until the end of the Late Bronze Age, which ranges from 1100 BC to 550 BC.  This and aspects of the decoration may suggest a Danubian origin or influence in the object, although the National Museum of Denmark is confident it is of Nordic origin.

Sun chariot in Indo-European mythology

Norse mythology

The chariot has  been interpreted as a possible Bronze Age predecessor to Skinfaxi, the horse that pulled Dagr, the personification of day, across the sky.

Celtic Pantheon
The sky god Taranis is typically depicted with the attribute of a spoked wheel.

Hindu scriptures

The Rigveda in Hindu scriptures  also reflects the mention of the Sun chariot. RV 10.85 mentions the sun god's bride as seated on a chariot pulled by two steeds.
The relevant verses are the following (trans.  Griffith):

10. Her spirit was the bridal car; the covering thereof was heaven:
     Bright were both Steeds that drew it when Surya approached her husband's home.
11. Thy Steeds were steady, kept in place by holy verse and Sama-hymn:
     All car were thy two chariot wheels: thy path was tremulous in the sky,
12. Clean, as thou wentest, were thy wheels, wind was the axle fastened there.
     Surya, proceeding to her Lord, mounted a spirit-fashioned car.

Greek mythology

In Greek mythology, the solar deity Helios was said to wear a radiant crown as his horse-drawn chariot raced across the sky, bringing daylight.

See also
Egtved Girl
Golden hat
Håga Kurgan
Nebra skydisk
Phaëton
Sól (sun)
Sun worship
The King's Grave
Urnfield culture
Cult Wagon of Strettweg

References

Sources
Sandars, Nancy K., Prehistoric Art in Europe, Penguin (Pelican, now Yale, History of Art), 1968 (nb 1st edn.)

External links

Reconstructing the Trundholm Sun Chariot, Anders Söderberg, Sweden, 2002. Söderberg demonstrates how part of the chariot might have been made using the lost-wax method.
Götter und Helden in der Bronzezeit: Europa im Zeitalter des Odysseus, exhibition, Bonn. 1999. Catalogue introduction, wall panel information: (.doc format)

Prehistoric objects in the National Museum of Denmark
Archaeological discoveries in Denmark
2nd-millennium BC works
Archaeoastronomy
Prehistory of Denmark
Nordic Bronze Age
Germanic archaeological artifacts
Bronzeware
Bronze Age art
Horses in art
Sun in art
Danish Culture Canon
Solar chariot
Ancient art in metal